Gijs Van Hoecke (born 12 November 1991) is a Belgian cyclist, who currently rides for UCI ProTeam .

Career
In 2011, when he was 19 years old, he was selected to participate at the Track Cycling World Championships, where he won the bronze medal in the Men's omnium. One year later, at the World Championships in Melbourne, he finished ninth in the same event and became Madison World Champion.

At the 2012 Summer Olympics, he competed in the Men's team pursuit for the Belgian national team, and the men's omnium.

Van Hoecke won the bronze medal at the Madison in the 2013 European Track Championships. During that year, he also won his first six-day race in Amsterdam.

In 2014, Van Hoecke won the Internationale Wielertrofee Jong Maar Moedig road race. In May 2018, he was named in the startlist for the 2018 Giro d'Italia.

Major results

Track

2008
 2nd  Madison, UCI Junior Track Cycling World Championships
 National Junior Track Championships
2nd Omnium
2nd Team pursuit
2nd Kilo
2nd Individual pursuit
2009
 1st  Omnium, National Junior Track Championships
 2nd  Madison, UCI Juniors Track World Championships (with Jochen Deweer)
2010
 2nd  Omnium, UEC European Under-23 Track Championships
 2nd  Scratch, 2010–11 UCI Track Cycling World Cup Classics, Cali
2011
 1st  Scratch, 2011–12 UCI Track Cycling World Cup, Astana
 3rd  Omnium, UCI Track World Championships
2012
 1st  Madison, UCI Track World Championships (with Kenny De Ketele)
 UEC European Under-23 Track Championships
2nd  Madison (with Jasper De Buyst)
3rd  Team pursuit
 2nd Six Days of Ghent (with Kenny De Ketele)
 3rd  Team pursuit, 2012–13 UCI Track Cycling World Cup, Glasgow
2013
 1st Six Days of Amsterdam (with Kenny De Ketele)
 3rd  Madison, UEC European Track Championships (with Kenny De Ketele)
 3rd Six Days of Ghent (with Kenny De Ketele)
2015
 2nd Six Days of Ghent (with Kenny De Ketele)
 3rd Six Days of London (with Iljo Keisse)

Road
Source: 

2009
 1st  Overall Giro della Toscana Juniors
 5th Overall Münsterland Tour
2011
 1st  Overall Ronde van de Provincie Antwerpen
 2nd Paris–Tours Espoirs
2012
 3rd Ronde van Zeeland Seaports
2013
 2nd Grand Prix Criquielion
2014
 1st Internationale Wielertrofee Jong Maar Moedig
2015
 1st  Combativity classification Eneco Tour
 8th Internationale Wielertrofee Jong Maar Moedig
 10th Overall Ster ZLM Toer
 10th Ronde van Limburg
2016
 6th Overall Danmark Rundt
 8th Overall Ster ZLM Toer
2019
 6th Overall Okolo Slovenska
2021
 9th Grand Prix of Aargau Canton

Grand Tour general classification results timeline

References

External links
 
 
 
 
 
 
 

1991 births
Living people
Belgian male cyclists
Olympic cyclists of Belgium
Cyclists at the 2012 Summer Olympics
Sportspeople from Ghent
Cyclists from East Flanders
UCI Track Cycling World Champions (men)
Belgian track cyclists